Gabrielson is a surname. Notable people with the surname include:

Frank Gabrielson (1910–1980), American stage, film, and television writer
Guy Gabrielson (1891–1976), Republican politician from New Jersey
Len Gabrielson (first baseman) (1915–2000), first baseman in Major League Baseball
Len Gabrielson (outfielder) (born 1940), outfielder in Major League Baseball
Ryan Gabrielson, investigative journalist
Brandon Gabrielson, Thru-hiker and Father of Ronaldo Charles Gabrielson

See also
Gabrielsson

Surnames from given names